Goalkeepers is an initiative launched by the Bill and Melinda Gates Foundation in 2017 to bring together leaders from around the world to accelerate progress toward achieving the Sustainable Development Goals (SDG). The initiative also provides reports and data flow charts over SDGs progress since 1990.

Its core event is the annual Goalkeepers Conference (which usually takes place during Global Goals Week and the UN General Assembly) at which the Changemaker Award is bestowed to 'extraordinary individuals who are driving progress in their communities and countries'. Invitations are issued to global leaders and aspiring personalities who have been personally selected by the board. Previous attendees include Barack Obama, Emmanuel Macron, Amina J. Mohammed, Erna Solberg, Malala Yousafzai, and Trevor Noah. Past award winners have included Yusra Mardini, Amika George, Ria Sharma, and Nadia Murad, who later went on to win the Nobel Peace Prize.

Conferences and awards

2022
The fourth in-person Goalkeepers event was held in September 2022 at Jazz at Lincoln Center in New York City. Speakers included:
 Mia Mottley, Prime Minister of Barbados

The winner of the Global Goalkeeper award was:
 Ursula von der Leyen

Further awards went to:
 Zahra Joya: Changemaker Award
 Vanessa Nakate: Campaign Award
 Radhika Batra: Progress Award

2021 
The 2021 Goalkeepers conference could not take place physically, due to the COVID-19 pandemic, but had to be held virtually. The winner of the Global Goalkeeper award was:
 Phumzile Mlambo-Ngcuka

Further awards went to:
 Jenifer Colpas: Changemaker Award
 Satta Sheriff: Campaign Award
 Fairooz Faizah: Progress Award

2020 

The 2020 Goalkeepers conference could not take place physically, due to the COVID-19 pandemic, but had to be held virtually. The winner of the Global Goalkeeper award was:
 John Nkengasong, Director of the Africa Centres for Disease Control and Prevention for being a "relentless proponent of global collaboration and evidence-based public health practices, and a champion for minimizing the social and economic consequences of COVID-19 across the African continent"

The Global Goals awards went to:
 Bonita Sharma, co-founder and CEO of Social Changemakers and Innovators (SOCHAI) – a youth-led non-profit organization in Nepal
 Hauwa Ojeifo, founder of She Writes Woman, a women-led movement giving mental health a voice in Nigeria
 The MASH Project Foundation, a youth led social enterprise based in India that develops and implements support systems for people who work for social causes through partnerships.

2019 

The third annual Goalkeepers event was held September 25–26, 2019, at Jazz at Lincoln Center in New York City. Speakers included:
 Jacinda Ardern, Prime Minister of New Zealand
 Pedro Sánchez, Prime Minister of Spain
 Jennifer Eberhardt
 Aliko Dangote
 Senjuti Saha

The Global Goalkeeper Award was given to:

 Narendra Modi, Prime Minister of India, for successfully implementing the Swachh Bharat Mission, a cleanliness and sanitation project, including 110 million family and public toilets for poor and middle income families, reducing the Indian open defecation rate from 50% to almost 0% in 3 years. He personally makes cleaning initiatives - plogging along the roads and beaches - leading by example to promote mass fitness and cleanliness.

Ahead of the ceremony, human rights groups and three Nobel Peace Prize winners – Shirin Ebadi, Tawakkol Karman and Mairead Maguire – criticized in a letter to the Bill & Melinda Gates Foundation the decision to bestow an award upon Modi, stating that under his leadership, “India has descended into dangerous and deadly chaos that has consistently undermined human rights, democracy.’’

The Global Goals awards went to:
 Payal Jangid: Changemaker Award
 Aya Chebbi: Campaign Award
 Gregory Rockson: Progress Award

2018

The second annual Goalkeepers event was held September 25–26, 2018, in New York City. Speakers included:

 Emmanuel Macron, President of France
 Julius Maada, President of Sierra Leone
 Erna Solberg, Prime Minister of Norway
 King Kaka

The Global Goals awards went to:
 Nadia Murad: Changemaker Award
 Amika George: Campaign Award
 Dysnus Kisilu: Progress Award

2017
The first annual Goalkeepers event was held September 25–26, 2017, at Jazz at Lincoln Center in New York City. Speakers included:

 Barack Obama, President of the United States
 Justin Trudeau, Prime Minister of Canada
 Queen Rania of Jordan
will.i.am
 Malala
 Stephen Fry
 George The Poet

Advisory board 
The Goalkeepers program is being advised by several individuals, including the following:

 Hervé Berville (since 2022)
 Lukas Köhler (2019–2022)
 Prajakta Koli (since 2022)
 Tlaleng Mofokeng (since 2022)

References 

Bill & Melinda Gates Foundation
Sustainable development